Wickman is a surname. Notable people with the surname include:

Bob Wickman (born 1969), American professional baseball player
Ivar Wickman (1872–1914), Swedish physician who discovered the epidemic and contagious nature of polio
Lance B. Wickman (born 1940), American Mormon; general authority and general counsel of the LDS church
Linnéa Wickman (born 1992), Swedish politician
Percy Wickman (1941–2004), Canadian politician from Alberta; MLA for Edmonton Rutherford
Putte Wickman (1924–2006), Swedish clarinetist